Simple Simon is a patience or solitaire card game  played with a regular 52 cards deck (4 suits of 13 cards each without Jokers).  It is a close relative of the well-known Spider Solitaire. It became somewhat popular being featured in some computerized collections of Solitaire card games, but its origins possibly predate its implementation as a computerized game.

Rules 

At the beginning of the play the cards are dealt all facing the player, starting from 3 columns of 8 cards each, and then 7 columns with 7, 6, and so forth cards until 1.

A card can be placed on any card on the top of a column whose rank is greater
than it by one (with no cards that can be placed above an Ace). A sequence of
cards, decrementing in rank and of the same suit, can be moved as one. An
empty column can be filled by any card. A sequence of cards from the king down to
the Ace - all of the same suit - can be moved to the foundations. The object of
the game is to place all four suits in the foundations.

Strategy 

A mixed-suit sequence of cards can be moved to a different location, given
enough empty columns or parent cards to place intermediate components and
sub-sequences of cards on. This is similar to FreeCell only with the
individual components of the sequence being the same-suit sub-sequences
rather than individual cards as in FreeCell. Note that some implementations
of Simple Simon, require the player to do all the moving of the individual
components by himself.

Statistics and analysis 

In September 2001, Shlomi Fish adapted Freecell Solver, an automated solver for various solitaire card games, to solve Simple Simon. The statistics presented by the solver when run over a range of 4000 random games showed that about 85% of the games were solvable.  Another programmer added another type of move which reportedly increased the percentage of games that were solvable by the solver
to well over 90%.

In 2009 a more up-to-date version of Freecell Solver produced the result that the solver was able to solve 4,533 (or 90%) of the deals, and generally reached a conclusion within 100 moves.  The comment has been made that this is "what makes the game a joy: either it's impossible to solve and you see it in the first moves or it's solvable and you only have to find the best route."

References

See also
 Spider Solitaire
 List of solitaire games
 Glossary of solitaire terms

Patience video games
Spider patience card games
Single-deck patience card games
Year of introduction missing